Steffen Thoresen (born June 3, 1985) is a Norwegian ice hockey player. He is currently playing with the Storhamar of the Norwegian GET-ligaen.

International
Thoresen played with the Norway men's national ice hockey team at the 2007 IIHF World Championship. He was named to Team Norway for competition at the 2014 IIHF World Championship.

Career statistics

Regular season and playoffs

International

References

External links

1985 births
Living people
Lørenskog IK players
Norwegian ice hockey right wingers
Storhamar Dragons players
Växjö Lakers players
Vålerenga Ishockey players
Ice hockey people from Oslo
Norwegian expatriate ice hockey people
Norwegian expatriate sportspeople in Sweden
Ice hockey players at the 2018 Winter Olympics
Olympic ice hockey players of Norway